PHD finger protein 12 is a protein that in humans is encoded by the PHF12 gene.

Interactions 

PHF12 has been shown to interact with SIN3A.

References

Further reading